Colonel David Barr, CD, is the former Commander of the Canadian Special Operations Forces Command.

Biography
His early military service included platoon command with the 3rd Battalion Princess Patricia's Canadian Light Infantry in Victoria, British Columbia (1980-84), and subsequently with the Canadian Airborne Regiment in Petawawa, Ontario (1984-87).

He was the first commander of CSOFC. During his tenure as commander, Colonel Barr also deployed to Afghanistan as commander of the Canadian special operations task force in Operation Enduring Freedom.

References

External links
 

1959 births
Princess Patricia's Canadian Light Infantry officers
Canadian Airborne Regiment officers
Living people
Canadian Special Operations Force Command